V.P. Seemandini is a designated Senior Advocate mainly practicing in Constitutional matters from 1976 in High Court of Kerala and Supreme Court of India.

Career
Seemandini is currently serving as the President of Kerala Federation of Women Lawyers and was the President of All India Federation of Women Lawyers and founder member of the federation. Seemandini was born in Thrissur district, Kerala, India. She enrolled as an advocate in 1976.She is mainly practicing in Constitutional matters. She is legal adviser to many of the educational institutions in Kerala and Bangalore. She was designated as the Senior Advocate of High Court of Kerala in 2006 . Seemandini is the secretary of Sree Narayana Sevika Samajam, a nursing home for the elderly and an orphanage and President of Sree Dharma Paripalana Yogam, Pachalam branch.

References

External links 

1951 births
Living people
Malayali people
People from Thrissur district
Judges of the Kerala High Court
20th-century Indian lawyers
21st-century Indian lawyers
Women in Kerala politics
21st-century Indian judges
Women educators from Kerala
Educators from Kerala
20th-century Indian women judges
20th-century Indian judges
21st-century Indian women judges